True Crime was a British free-to-air television channel owned by Sony Pictures Television that originally launched on 22 March 2016, it was renamed as Sony Crime Channel 2 on 6 February 2018. The channel abruptly closed on 15 November 2018, along with sister channel Scuzz.

True Crime was relaunched on 12 February 2019, replacing TruTV, but then abruptly shut down again on 1 July 2019.

The +1 simulcast was removed from Sky on 27.06.2017 to make room for TruTV +1.

Logo history

References

English-language television stations in the United Kingdom
Sony Pictures Television
Television channels in the United Kingdom
Television channels and stations established in 2016
Television channels and stations disestablished in 2018
Television channels and stations established in 2019
Television channels and stations disestablished in 2019
Crime television networks